Nansihuan is a metro station of Zhengzhou Metro. The station currently serves as the southern terminus of Line 2 trains and an interchange station to Chengjiao line towards Xinzheng International Airport.

Station layout  
The station concourse is located on the ground level while the single island platform is underground on the B1 level.

Exits

References 

Stations of Zhengzhou Metro
Line 2, Zhengzhou Metro
Chengjiao line, Zhengzhou Metro
Railway stations in China opened in 2016